The Erkech dialect is a Bulgarian dialect, which is part of the Balkan group of the Eastern Bulgarian dialects. It originates from two villages in the eastern parts of the Balkan Mountains, Kozichino (formerly Erkech) near Pomorie and Golitsa south of Varna. As a result of the mass population movements that affected eastern Bulgaria during the 19th and the beginning of the 20th century, speakers of the dialect have established numerous colonies in the regions of Provadia, Varna, Novi Pazar, Balchik, Silistra and Pomorie, thus significantly expanding the range of the dialect.

Phonological and morphological characteristics

Due to the relative isolation of the two villages in the past, the Erkech dialect has a number of idiosyncratic features that separate it from the other Balkan dialects:
 Pronunciation of Old Church Slavonic ѫ (yus) and ъ as long broad е in a stressed syllable and as a slightly reduced a in an unstressed syllable - зп vs. formal зъп, дажд vs. formal дъждът. The Teteven dialect has a similar feature, although without long vowels
 Lack of consonant f which is replaced in all positions by  - кухар vs. formal куфар (suitcase), хурна vs. formal фурна (oven)

Most of the other phonological and morphological characteristics of the Erkech dialect are similar to the general features typical for all Balkan dialects, cf. article for details.

Sources
Стойков, Стойко: Българска диалектология, Акад. изд. "Проф. Марин Дринов", 2006 

Dialects of the Bulgarian language